Sladen may refer to:

Surname
 Sladen Peltier, Canadian actor
 Art Sladen (1860–1914), Major League Baseball player
 Arthur Sladen (1877–1934), English cricketer
 Constance Sladen (1848–1906), architectural historian and philanthropist
 Charles Sladen (1816–1884), Australian colonial politician
 Douglas Sladen (1856–1947), English author and professor at the University of Sydney
 Edward Bosc Sladen (1827–1890), British army officer
 Elisabeth Sladen (1946–2011), English actress
 Fred Winchester Sladen (1867–1945), superintendent of the U.S. Military Academy
 Joseph A. Sladen (1841–1911), U.S. Army general
 Percy Sladen (1849–1900), English biologist
 Sidney Sladen (born 1979), Kenya-born fashion designer
 Victoria Sladen (1910–1999), an opera singer in the 1952 radio opera Anna Kraus
 William J. L. Sladen (1920–2017), Welsh-American naturalist

Other uses
 Mount Sladen, on Coronation Island
 Percy Sladen Memorial Trust, a trust fund administered by the Linnean Society in memory of Percy Sladen
 Sladen's barbet, a species of bird found in Africa
 Sladen suit, a type of British drysuit, designed for diving
 Sladen Summit, Antarctica

See also
 Sladenia (disambiguation)
 Sladeniae, a synonym for the Fernando Po swift